Pantestudines or Pan-Testudines is the group of all reptiles more closely related to turtles than to any other living animal. It includes both modern turtles (crown group turtles, also known as Testudines) and all of their extinct relatives (also known as stem-turtles).

Classification
The identity of the ancestors and closest relatives of the turtle lineage was a longstanding scientific mystery, though new discoveries and better analyses in the early 21st century began to clarify turtle relationships. Analysis of fossil data has shown that turtles are diapsid reptiles, most closely related either to the archosaurs (crocodiles, bird, and relatives) or the lepidosaurs (lizards, tuatara, and relatives). Genetic analysis strongly favors the hypothesis that turtles are the closest relatives of the archosaurs, though studies using only fossil evidence often continue to recover them as relatives of lepidosaurs. Studies using only fossils, as well as studies using a combination of fossil and genetic evidence, both suggest that sauropterygians, the group of prehistoric marine reptiles including the plesiosaurs and the often superficially turtle-like placodonts, are themselves stem-turtles.

Although morphology-based analyses usually do not support a turtle-archosaur clade (Archelosauria), Bhullar & Bever (2009) identified a laterosphenoid bone, typical of Archosauriformes, in the stem-turtle Proganochelys. It may serve as a synapomorphy for this proposed clade.

The cladogram shown below follows the most likely result found by an analysis of turtle relationships using both fossil and genetic evidence by M.S. Lee, in 2013. This study found Eunotosaurus, usually regarded as a turtle relative, to be only very distantly related to turtles in the clade Parareptilia. However, Lee discusses the necessity to investigate the possibility that parareptiles are actually archelosaurs instead of non-saurian sauropsids.

The cladogram below follows the most likely result found by another analysis of turtle relationships, this one using only fossil evidence, published by Rainer Schoch and Hans-Dieter Sues in 2015. This study found Eunotosaurus to be an actual early stem-turtle, though other versions of the analysis found weak support for it as a parareptile.

Benton (2015) compiled 2 synapomorphies of Ankylopoda (which would also include Sauropterygia, Thalattosauria and Ichthyosauria close to lepidosaurs), prootic-parietal contact and hooked fifth metatarsal, and 6 of Archelosauria: posterodorsal process on maxilla, sagittal crest, slender and tapering cervical ribs, notch on anterior margin of interclavicle, small anterior process and larger posterior process on iliac blade, and medial centrale in carpus absent.

Time-calibrated phylogeny recovered by Shaffer et al. (2017) dated the split of Pantestudines from its sister clade (the clade containing archosaurs and all tetrapods more closely related to archosaurs than to any other living animals) to mid-Carboniferous. Laurin and Piñeiro (2017) placed turtles close to pareiasaurs within Parareptilia, a clade they considered sister to Neodiapsida.

The cladogram below follows the analysis of Li et al. (2018). It agrees with the placement of turtles within Diapsida but finds them outside of Sauria (the Lepidosauromorpha + Archosauromorpha clade).

Gardner & Van Franken (2020) criticized the analysis by Li et al., citing problems with the data set and observing that their proposed phylogeny was not supported once the issues were corrected.

Lichtig & Lucas (2021) proposed Pappochelys was related to sauropterygians, Eunotosaurus was a caseid synapsid, and turtles were derived pareiasaur parareptiles close to Anthodon. According to this hypothesis, the turtle shell evolved from a fusion of the ribs to dorsal osteoderms. Odontocheys, which lacked a carapace, is seen as a highly derived taxon instead of a representative of the ancestral state of turtles. The reliability of the molecular support for Archelosauria was also questioned, although Simões et al. (2022) found morphological support for this hypothesis. In their analysis, Pappochelys is the basalmost pantestudine but Eunotosaurus is a basal neodiapsid instead of a stem-turtle, parareptile or synapsid.

References

 
Prehistoric reptile taxa